The Third Amendment of the Constitution Bill 1958 was a proposal to amend the Constitution of Ireland to alter the electoral system from proportional representation under the single transferable vote (PR-STV) to first-past-the-post (FPTP). The proposal was rejected in a referendum held on 17 June 1959. This was the same date as the presidential election in which Taoiseach Éamon de Valera was elected as president.

Proposed change
The subject matter of the referendum was described as follows:

The Third Amendment of the Constitution Bill 1958 –
At present, members of Dáil Éireann are elected on a system of proportional representation for constituencies returning at least three members, each voter having a single transferable vote. It is proposed in the Bill to abolish the system of proportional representation and to adopt, instead, a system of single-member constituencies, each voter having a single non-transferable vote. It is also proposed in the Bill to set up a Commission for the determination and revision of the constituencies, instead of having this done by the Oireachtas, as at present.

Background
Proportional representation by means of the single transferable vote had been used in Irish elections since the 1920 local elections. Under the Government of Ireland Act 1920, it was prescribed for elections to both the Southern Ireland House of Commons and the Northern Ireland House of Commons (Northern Ireland was to revert to FPTP for the 1929 election). On independence in 1922, it was prescribed under the Constitution of the Irish Free State for elections to Dáil Éireann. Similarly, under the Constitution of Ireland adopted in 1937, Article 16.2.5º prescribed PR-STV, while 16.2.6º specified that the number of members in a constituency would not be less than three.

The amendment proposed to alter the electoral system for elections to Dáil Éireann to first-past-the-post (FPTP) under single-seat constituencies. It also proposed to establish an independent commission for the drawing of constituency boundaries on a constitutional basis. It was introduced by the Fianna Fáil government of Éamon de Valera but was opposed by Fine Gael, the main opposition party, and by the Labour Party.

Oireachtas debate
The amendment was proposed by Taoiseach Éamon de Valera on 12 November 1958. It was passed by the Dáil on 28 January 1959 by 74 votes to 55. On 19 March 1959, it was rejected in the Seanad by 29 votes to 28. Under Article 23.1, the Dáil may vote to deem a bill to have been passed by the Seanad by a resolution passed after a period of 90 days from being sent by the Dáil to the Seanad. On 13 May 1959, the Dáil passed such a resolution by 75 votes to 56, and the bill proceeded to a referendum.

Result

Aftermath
A second attempt by Fianna Fáil to abolish PR was rejected by voters in the 1968 referendum on the electoral system.

See also
Constitutional amendment
History of the Republic of Ireland
Politics of the Republic of Ireland

References

Sources

Citations

External links
 Referendum (Amendment) Act, 1959

1958 in Irish politics
1959 in Irish politics
1959 in Irish law
1959 referendums
03a
03a
Single transferable vote
Amendment, 03
Electoral reform referendums
June 1959 events in Europe